Admir Bajrovic (born 6 August 1995) is a Swedish professional footballer who plays as a forward for Greek Super League 2 club Panserraikos.

International career 
Bajrovic represented the Sweden U17 and U19 teams between 2012 and 2013.

Career statistics

Club

Honours

NEC Nijmegen
Eerste Divisie: 2014–15

References

External links

1995 births
Living people
Swedish footballers
Sweden youth international footballers
Association football forwards
Eredivisie players
Eerste Divisie players
NEC Nijmegen players
Superettan players
Ljungskile SK players
Östers IF players
Gefle IF players
Norwegian First Division players
Follo FK players
Super League Greece players
Panetolikos F.C. players
Liga I players
Sepsi OSK Sfântu Gheorghe players
Admir Bajrovic
Admir Bajrovic
Panserraikos F.C. players
Swedish expatriate footballers
Expatriate footballers in the Netherlands
Swedish expatriate sportspeople in the Netherlands
Expatriate footballers in Norway
Swedish expatriate sportspeople in Norway
Expatriate footballers in Greece
Swedish expatriate sportspeople in Greece
Expatriate footballers in Romania
Swedish expatriate sportspeople in Romania
Swedish people of Bosnia and Herzegovina descent